George Maddox Farm, also known as Cottage Hall Farm or Albert Sudler Farm, is a historic farm complex located at Manokin, Somerset County, Maryland. It is an intact complex of 15 agricultural buildings and structures dating from about 1800 through the early 20th century. The complex includes six pre-Civil War structures including a frame granary, two dairies, a log smokehouse, another (ruined) log outbuilding, and a frame kitchen/quarter. Seven post-war structures include a barn, two garages, tenant house, privy, well house, and chicken house. The main house is a -story irregular-plan Queen Anne house, roughly cruciform in plan. An early-19th-century single-story kitchen extends from the back of the house.

It was listed on the National Register of Historic Places in 1985.

References

External links
, including photo from 1981, at Maryland Historical Trust

Houses in Somerset County, Maryland
Houses on the National Register of Historic Places in Maryland
Queen Anne architecture in Maryland
National Register of Historic Places in Somerset County, Maryland